Tanya Tucker is the fourth studio album by American country music singer Tanya Tucker. It was released on April 21, 1975, by MCA Records. The album was produced by Snuff Garrett and includes two No. 1 singles, "Lizzie and the Rainman" and "San Antonio Stroll".

Critical reception

The review published in the May 3, 1975 issue of Billboard said, "Tanya's first MCA effort is kind of a long shot as far as the top half of the charts are concerned, but if her single hits she could do it. Producer Snuff Garrett has wisely chosen a mix of country, country oriented pop and straight pop for the set, with the intent obviously to keep her country but break her pop. Tanya still has one of the finest voices in music, pop, country or otherwise, and the new material simply offers her the chance to show off that voice in more directions. Strongest cuts are the ones leaning more toward country, though the pop oriented tunes are commercial enough. Expect pop play here. Only complaint is that from time to time the phrasing sounds a bit like Cher's. Still, it seems impossible this lady could ever make a bad album and she hasn't here." The review also noted "Lizzie and the Rainman", "Love of a Rolling Stone", "The King of Country Music", "When Will I Be Loved", "Son of a Preacher Man", "Someday Soon", and "Traveling Salesman" as the best cuts on the album.

Cashbox published a review in the May 10, 1975 issue which said, "Tanya's first LP for MCA Records was produced by Snuff Garrett and contains her current hot single "Lizzie and the Rainman". Each selection is treated to superb vocals using her untouchable style of demanding emotion from each and every selection. Some of our personal favorites are: "San Antonio Stroll", "When Will I Be Loved", "Someday Soon", and "Traveling Salesman"."

Commercial performance
The album peaked at No. 8 on the US Billboard Hot Country LPs chart and No. 113 on the US Billboard Top LPs & Tape chart.

The album's first single, "Lizzie and the Rainman", was released in April 1975 and peaked at No. 1 on the US Billboard Hot Country Singles chart, No. 37 on the US Billboard Hot 100 chart, and No. 7 on the US Billboard Easy Listening chart. It also peaked at No. 1 in Canada on the RPM Country Singles chart, No. 66 on the RPM Top Singles chart, and No. 2 on the RPM Adult Contemporary Singles chart. The second single, "San Antonio Stroll", was released in August 1975 and peaked at No. 1 on the US Billboard Hot Country Singles chart No. 2 in Canada on the RPM Country Singles chart. "Traveling Salesman" was released as the second single in the UK in October 1975 and failed to chart.

Track listing

Personnel
Adapted from the album liner notes.
Tanya Tucker – lead vocals
Al Capps – arrangements
Phil Everly — harmony vocals on "When Will I Be Loved"
Snuff Garrett – producer
Lenny Roberts – engineer
Hal Blaine – percussion

Charts
Album

Singles

References

1975 albums
Tanya Tucker albums
Albums produced by Snuff Garrett
MCA Records albums